The Lüttmoorsiel-Nordstrandischmoor island railway, also called the Loren Railway (Lorenbahn), is a German,  narrow gauge island railway through the North Frisian Wadden Sea from Beltringharder Koog on the mainland to the Hallig of Nordstrandischmoor.

Legal status 
The line is a piece of non-public railway infrastructure owned by the state of Schleswig-Holstein and operated by the State Department for Coastal Defence, National Parks and Marine Conservation (Landesbetrieb für Küstenschutz, Nationalpark und Meeresschutz) or LKN-SH – formerly the Office for Rural Regions (Amt für ländliche Räume).

History 

The  narrow gauge railway was built in 1933/1934 from Cecilienkoog over a pile-supported embankment to Nordstrandischmoor in order to transport construction material for the sea defences of the hallig. On 1 March 1956 the line was destroyed by ice floes, but later rebuilt. In 1977 the pile dam was filled with rubble to make the line more stable. When the new outer dyke around the Beltringharder Koog was completed, the section of track between the Cecilien Koog and the new outer dyke was abandoned. The annual figures given for this are 1985 and 1988. In 2000, a new, paved Lorendamm embankment was built, which can now be worked largely independently of the tide table and is only impassable when there is a storm surge.

Infrastructure 
The main storage depot for the railway is behind the new outer dyke. This is crossed by a switchback and has a siding on the outer side.  It follows the embankment for about 3 km of its length. In the middle there is another siding. On the island, the route branches to Nordstrandischmoor station and Neuwarft, which is the only one of the four warfs on the island of Nordstrandischmoor with its own railway link.

Rolling stock 
Some of the stock belongs to the State Department for Coastal Defence and National Parks.  There are two locomotives, goods wagons for construction work and two construction wagons (Bauwagen), which provide shelter for the workers during construction work.

The other vehicles belong to the residents of Nordstrandischmoor. Each household has its own wagon. These are draisines powered by internal combustion engine, some with a trailer. Initially, the trucks had sails and were powered by wind. These vehicles are for the personal use of the islanders and their guests. There is no commercial traffic. Drivers must be at least 15 years old and hold a moped licence.

The locals refer to this railway as the Lorenbahn. A Lore is one of the wagons – powered or not – that works the line. This differs from the usual use of the German railway term Lore or Güterlore which refers to a tipper wagon.

Gallery

Sources 
 Petersen, Marcus (1981). Die Halligen. Küstenschutz – Sanierung – Naturschutz. Neumünster. 
 Rogl, Hans Wolfgang (1996). Die Nordsee-Inselbahnen. 6. Auflage, alba, Düsseldorf,

External links 
 
 Nordstrandischmoor Island Railway 

Railway lines in Schleswig-Holstein
Nordfriesland
600 mm gauge railways in Germany
Railways with Zig Zags